The SEAMUS Award (renamed from the SEAMUS Lifetime Achievement Award)  acknowledges the important contributions of its recipients to the field of electroacoustic music. The recipient is selected by the Board of Directors of SEAMUS. The prize was first awarded in 1987.

The winners have been:

1987 Vladimir Ussachevsky
1988 Les Paul
1989 Mario Davidovsky
1990 Otto Luening
1991 Robert Moog
1993 John Chowning
1994 Max Mathews
1995 Milton Babbitt
1996 Charles Dodge
1997 Louis Barron and Bebe Barron
1998 Morton Subotnick
1999 Pauline Oliveros
2000 Paul Lansky
2001 Herbert Brün
2002 Don Buchla
2003 Jon Appleton
2004 Barry Vercoe
2005 Wendy Carlos
2006 Alvin Lucier
2007 Joel Chadabe
2008 Miller Puckette
2009 Larry Austin
2010 Curtis Roads
2011 Laurie Anderson
2012 George E. Lewis
2013 Laurie Spiegel
2014 Barry Schrader
2015 Dave Smith
2016 Pamela Z
2017 Carla Scaletti
2018 Scott A. Wyatt
2019 Gordon Mumma
2020 Annea Lockwood
2022 Maggi Payne

References

American music awards
Lifetime achievement awards
Awards established in 1987
1987 establishments in the United States